Osuchów may refer to the following places:
Osuchów, Białobrzegi County in Masovian Voivodeship (east-central Poland)
Osuchów, Zwoleń County in Masovian Voivodeship (east-central Poland)
Osuchów, Żyrardów County in Masovian Voivodeship (east-central Poland)
Osuchów, Greater Poland Voivodeship (west-central Poland)